Winnicavis is a genus of passerine bird from the Early Oligocene of Poland.

References

Prehistoric bird genera
Passeriformes
Oligocene birds
Prehistoric birds of Europe
Fossil taxa described in 2018